In mathematics, the Bott residue formula, introduced by , describes a sum over the fixed points of a holomorphic vector field of a compact complex manifold.

Statement

If v is a holomorphic vector field on a compact complex manifold M, then

where
The sum is over the fixed points p of the vector field v
The linear transformation Ap is the action induced by v on the holomorphic tangent space at p
P is an invariant polynomial function of matrices of degree dim(M)
Θ is a curvature matrix of the holomorphic tangent bundle

See also

Atiyah–Bott fixed-point theorem
Holomorphic Lefschetz fixed-point formula

References

Complex manifolds